Nightfall: The Black Chronicles was a three-issue comic book mini-series,  published by Wildstorm through their Homage Comics imprint from December 1999 until February 2000. The comic was written by Ford Lytle Gillmore, pencilled by Tomm Coker, with Troy Hubbs and Christy Stuck inking and Jason Palmer as the colorist.

The series takes place on an earth where the supernatural exists and are organized into various groups, tribes, or clans. In the 8th century a truce, called "Pax Daemonica", was arranged between the monsters and the Catholic Church. Part of this treaty also involved the creation of group that would police the monster world, the Nightwatch.

Summary
The series is set in New Orleans and follows Mason Black, a retired member of the Nightwatch organization, as he gets pulled back into a case involving a group of vampires he thought he and, fellow Nightwatch operative Damocles, had destroyed years earlier. It's soon revealed that the vampires are simply the tip of the iceberg. A former Nightwatch operative from the 1920s, code named Proteus, was beginning to organize the monsters in an attempt to destroy Nightwatch and take over the human world.

Characters
Mason Black – A former Nightwatch operative in New Orleans who retired when he became disenchanted with the group due to the amount of corruption that had infested it. It's suggested that since then he's become something a freelance agent, though no real detail is given as to what he's doing prior to the beginning of the series. He often hangs out in a bar owned and operated by his father whom he calls Pops. He has a number of contacts and allies within Nightwatch, the monster groups, and other groups. While he was a Nightwatch operative he used the codename, Charon.

Proteus – A former Nightwatch operative in New Orleans during the 1920s. While investigating a bootlegging operation he was shot in the knee, the injury resulted in his being transferred from a field agent to a member of the disinformation division. His job in the division was to edit news stories, leak false information and publish pulp novels to cover up the existence of the monsters races. Some of his pen names during this time included Seabury Quinn and Howard Lovecraft. As time went on he became increasingly interested in the black arts, and began practicing black magic. He used his knowledge to regain the complete use of his knee in the hopes that he could return to field work, but Father, the New Orleans director, ordered him to cease using magic or pay the price. He initially fell into a depression that eventually shifted into hatred for Nightwatch for what he felt was their betrayal, and eventually began to plot his revenge. He enacted a ritual to summon a demon known as Azoth Nreh-Shul into his body, hoping to use its powers to destroy Nightwatch. However his plans were discovered and Father tracked him down and shot him in the head and the heart with two silver bullets. Proteus survived the encounter and spent the intervening years recovering from his injuries and slowly building up his power. He eventually resurfaces with a small army of monsters at his command, and begins to kill off various Nightwatch operatives. Eventually Mason and his allies track Proteus down to his lair within an abandoned orphanage, where they launch an assault against him. During the battle he swallows Mason whole and is then blown up from the inside by him. Afterwards his remains are cremated by Mason ensuring that he'll never be able to regenerate or return again. Proteus has the ability to control weak minded monsters, including vampires, zombies, and werewolves, and can shift between a human form a large monstrous lovecraftian form.

Seth – Mason's protégé prior to leaving Nightwatch. He's young, hotheaded Nightwatch agent and is responsible for bringing the Proteus situation to Mason's attention. Seth seems to be very inexperienced and has his first encounter with vampires during this series. Later he's turned into a vampire and sent to kill Father, but is returned to his human form thanks to being injected with a vampire anti-toxin by Mason. He then takes part in storming Proteus' lair during which Mason finally kills Proteus.

Father – Father is the head of the New Orleans branch of Nightwatch, and a Catholic priest. He was the head of Nightwatch during the 1920s and is still active in that role during the series. He was a close friend of Proteus and was the man who tried to warn him away from practicing black magic, and was also the one who shot him in the head and heart. He attempts to get the authorization to launch a full Nightwatch backed attack on Proteus, but is order to stand down and allow Mason to handle the situation instead in the hopes that Mason and Proteus would kill each other. Despite his orders he accompanies Mason and his allies during their attack on Proteus' lair, filling the sprinkler system with holy water to use against his vampire minions. His left palm has a scar in the shape of a cross, where he got the scar and what its purpose is are unknown.

Dario Fulci – Head of the Fulci zombie clan, Dario Fulci is involved in numerous illegal operations and has been residing in New Orleans since the 1920s. Fearing that Proteus would eventually become a threat to his operations, Fulci informs Mason in on Proteus' background, and also sends Jimmy Bones, a skeleton hitman, to aid Mason and his allies during their final attack on Proteus' lair. He has a pet zombie cat named Lucio, and he also serves as the narrator for the miniseries.

1999 comics debuts
WildStorm limited series